Lemur Street is a television show produced by Oxford Scientific Films for Animal Planet International which is based on the successful format of Meerkat Manor. The series premièred in the United Kingdom on 20 November 2007 on the UK Animal Planet network with Martin Shaw narrating.

On 8 February 2008 it aired in the United States under the name Lemur Kingdom, with fourteen episodes airing until 9 May 2008. It was removed from the air with the return of the channel's top series, Meerkat Manor.

Lemur Street was released in a three disc DVD set in the United Kingdom in September 2008 by Eureka Entertainment.

Production details
The twenty-episode series focusses on two competing matriarchal ring-tailed lemur troops in the Berenty Reserve on the island of Madagascar. Along with following the lemurs' battles for dominance, against their natural enemies and against each other, the series is reported to include the first professionally recorded footage of a ring-tailed lemur giving birth.

Robin Smith, who filmed several series of Meerkat Manor, is the cinematographer for Lemur Street.

National variations
The content of the UK and US versions of the programme are the same for most episodes, however Animal Planet US renamed the show Lemur Kingdom, added names for the episodes - which were referred to by number in the UK - and renamed the lemur troops and some individual lemurs. The troop called The Tornadoes in Lemur Street have been renamed "The Furies". Furies was chosen by Animal Planet US because of the constant infighting between the three families which make up the troop. Crystal, the dominant female of the Graveyards, has been renamed Juno and her mate Blake was renamed Marcus.

The lemurs

Tornadoes
This group is made up of three separate families of lemurs and has approximately twenty members. In the US broadcast, they have been renamed to the "Furies" because of the regular fighting between the three families.

Amazon
Four years old, Amazon is a first time mother who ignores and neglects her first son, Gizmo.  Her neglectful nature leads to the rest of the troop doing the same and Gizmo's eventual death after he injures a leg. When she gives birth to her second baby, Orinoco, Amazon is a more attentive and caring mother. Between the fifth and six episodes, she and her mother Flame viciously attack and dethrone the pregnant Electra. Though she initially allows Electra to remain as the lowest ranking member of the troop, after Electra gives birth Amazon evicts her from the troop.

Electra
At the start of the series, Electra is the queen of the group and known for her bad temper. In the sixth episode, while she is pregnant, Amazon and Flame dethrone Electra. Electra goes into premature labour, giving birth to a son named Prince. After she gives birth, Amazon, joined by her sister Snowflake and mother Flame, evicts Electra and Prince from the troop. During the night, however, Prince is unable to maintain his hold on his mother and falls from the tree where they are sleeping. Electra finds his body in the morning and mourns his death, guarding the body for several hours before leaving to return to the protection of the forest. In the final episode she returned to the family

Snowflake
Amazon's sister and Flame's daughter. In the ninth episode she helps her sister and mother to dethrone Electra and her newborn son Prince.

Flame
Amazon and Snowlake's mother. Amazon and Flame dethroned Electra. After Electra gives birth, Flame helps her daughters Amazon and Snowflake dethroned Electra and her son Prince from family.

Stella
Tornadoes' ex-queen and Chelsea's mother. She pets Chelsea and is very concerned about her.

Chelsea
Stella's spoiled daughter. In the fourth episode she threw Gizmo off from a branch, ruining his life, whereupon, in the next episode, he died. In the eight episode she is strayed of her family and lost. Family found her alive in a tree.

Flash
Tornadoes' dominant male.

Gizmo
Amazon's first son, who was born late and is the runt of the litter. At the start of the series, he is five months old and regularly neglected by his mother. He falls from a tree and injures his left rear leg after an unprovoked attack by spoiled princess Chelsea. He tries to keep up with the troop, but with his injuries he is often left behind and dies in the third episode. It is unclear how he dies, but the narration suggests it was a predator.

Graveyards
Made up of only one family, this twenty member gang is named from the fact that they live in an old graveyard. In the US broadcast, their name is changed to the "Graveyard Gang".

Crystal
The steady, dominant female of the Graveyards who has led the group for four years. In the seventh episode, Crystal gives birth to her first baby Jasmine. In the US broadcast, Crystal's name has been changed to Juno.

Tapas
Crystal and Sophie's sister and Josephine's daughter.

Sophie

Tapas and Crystal's sister and Josephine's daughter.

Josephine
Graveyards' ex-queen. Tapas, Sophie and Crystal's mother. She transferred power to Crystal before shooting.

Blake
The ageing, dominant male facing growing competition for his position from the younger lemurs. During a battle with Flash, the dominant male of the Tornadoes, Blake receives a bad slash to his right front paw. In the US broadcast, he is renamed Marcus.

Milton
One of the Graveyards' males

Peg Leg
At thirteen years old, Peg Leg is the oldest, lowest ranking member of the troop. He lost one of his back legs in a dog attack 11 years before the start of the series. Peg Leg usually gets out of the way during battles and avoids the mating fights. Despite having only three legs, Crystal chooses him as her mate when she comes into heat. Crystal later gives birth to her first baby, Jasmine. He is frequently in the company of his sidekick Nimbus, another low ranking male. After six years with the Graveyards, Peg Leg, joined by Nimbus, attempted to leave the troop to find a new one, an act called Biological dispersal which helps avoid inbreeding. But they were unable to find another one and return to the Graveyards.

Derrick
Peg Leg's best friend

Liberty
The lowest ranking female of the Graveyards and mother of Hogarth. She mates with Blake, the dominant male, after he chases away a nomadic male named Titus. With her family facing starvation and Crystal concentrating on feeding her immediate family during the dry season, and pregnant herself, Liberty leads her family to desert the Graveyards for a day. A few days later, Liberty gives birth to a daughter named Lily.

Emily
Liberty and Peg Leg's daughter and Hogarth's elder sister. In the fourteenth episode she gave birth to a daughter named Willow.

Hogarth
Liberty's independent son. He went into the woods during the attack of stray males and lost the family. He successfully returned home, but spent night alone. Fire cut off the road to his family. They returned the next day and found Hogarth alive.

Episode listing

Media
The complete series was scheduled for release on Region 2 DVD in Europe as a 3 disc box set by Eureka Entertainment on 22 September 2008.

The DVD was released successfully, and rumours of a Blu-ray release have surfaced.

References
General for UK broadcast

General for US broadcast

Specific

External links
Official Animal Planet US website for Lemur Kingdom
Official Oxford Scientific Films website

Animal Planet original programming
2007 American television series debuts
2008 American television series endings
2000s British documentary television series
2007 British television series debuts
2008 British television series endings
Nature educational television series
Television series about mammals